The  Zoran Radmilović Award is an award presented by the Sterijino Theatre in Novi Sad, Serbia to actors predominating in dramatic arts.

The award is presented annually, since 1988. From its debut, it is considered one of the most prominent awards within Serbian theatre. The award itself is a bronze figure of Zoran Radmilović, an eminent Serbian theatre, television and film actor of the 20th-century.

Laureats

Zoranov brk
There is also a special award, Zoranov brk (Zoran's Moustache), linked with this award.

References

Awards established in 1988
Serbian film awards
Serbian theatre awards
Theatre acting awards